Rudolf "Rudi" Lochner (born 29 March 1953 in Berchtesgaden) is a German bobsledder who competed in the early 1990s. He won the silver medal in the two-man event at the 1992 Winter Olympics in Albertville.

Lochner also won a gold medal in the two-man event at the 1991 FIBT World Championships in Altenberg. He also finished third in the Bobsleigh World Cup two-man championships in 1991-2.
German bobsledder Johannes Lochner is his nephew.

References
 Bobsleigh two-man Olympic medalists 1932-56 and since 1964
 Bobsleigh two-man world championship medalists since 1931
 DatabaseOlympics.com profile
 List of two-man bobsleigh World Cup champions since 1985

1953 births
Bobsledders at the 1992 Winter Olympics
Bobsledders at the 1994 Winter Olympics
German male bobsledders
Olympic bobsledders of Germany
Olympic silver medalists for Germany
Living people
People from Berchtesgaden
Sportspeople from Upper Bavaria
Olympic medalists in bobsleigh
Medalists at the 1992 Winter Olympics